Oberea incompleta is a species of beetle in the family Cerambycidae. It was described by Léon Fairmaire in 1897.

References

incompleta
Beetles described in 1897